Gomphandra is a genus of plant in family Stemonuraceae. The genus contains over 40 different species. They are dioecious trees or shrubs.

Species
Gomphandra andamanica King, 1895
Gomphandra apoensis (Elmer) Merr., 1923
Gomphandra australiana F.Muell., 1867
Gomphandra camchayensis Gagnep., 1947
Gomphandra capitulata (Jungh. & de Vriese) Becc., 1877
Gomphandra comosa King, 1895
Gomphandra coriacea Wight, 1840
Gomphandra crassipes Mast., 1875
Gomphandra cumingiana (Miers) Fern.-Vill., 1880
Gomphandra dolichocarpa Merr., 1937
Gomphandra donnaiensis (Gagnep.) Sleumer, 1969
Gomphandra flavicarpa (Elmer) Merr., 1923
Gomphandra fuliginea (Elmer) Merr., 1923
Gomphandra fusiformis Sleumer, 1969
Gomphandra gamblei (C.B.Clarke) P.Royen, 1957
Gomphandra javanica (Blume) Valeton, 1886
Gomphandra lancifolia Merr., 1920
Gomphandra luzoniensis (Merr.) Merr., 1923
Gomphandra lysipetala Stapf, 1894
Gomphandra mappioides Valeton, 1886
Gomphandra mollis Merr., 1942
Gomphandra montana (Schellenb.) Sleumer, 1940
Gomphandra oblongifolia Merr., 1920
Gomphandra obscurinervis Merr., 1938
Gomphandra oligantha Sleumer, 1940
Gomphandra pallida Sleumer, 1940
Gomphandra papuana (Becc.) Sleumer, 1940
Gomphandra parviflora (Blume) Valeton, 1886
Gomphandra petelotii Merr., 1942
Gomphandra pseudojavanica Sleumer, 1969
Gomphandra pseudoprasina Sleumer, 1940
Gomphandra quadrifida (Blume) Sleumer, 1940
Gomphandra sawiensis (Birnie) Sleumer, 1940
Gomphandra schoepfiifolia Sleumer, 1940
Gomphandra serrata King & Prain, 1900
Gomphandra simularensis Sleumer, 1969
Gomphandra subrostrata Merr., 1933
Gomphandra tetrandra (Wall.) Sleumer, 1940
Gomphandra tomentella Mast., 1875
Gomphandra velutina Sleumer, 1969
Gomphandra vitiensis (Seem.) Valeton, 1886

References

 
Asterid genera
Taxonomy articles created by Polbot
Dioecious plants